Commissure of labia majora may refer to:

 Anterior commissure of labia majora (commissura labiorum anterior)
 Posterior commissure of labia majora (commissura labiorum posterior)